Methylserotonin may refer to:

 5-Methoxytryptamine (O-methylserotonin)
 2-Methyl-5-hydroxytryptamine (2-methylserotonin)
 α-Methylserotonin, also known as α-methyl-5-hydroxytryptamine (α-methyl-5-HT)
 N-Methylserotonin